NGC 1871 (also known as ESO 56-SC85) is an open cluster associated with an emission nebula located in the Dorado constellation within the Large Magellanic Cloud. It was discovered by James Dunlop on November 5, 1826. Its apparent magnitude is 10.21, and its size is 2.0 arc minutes.

NGC 1871 is part of a triple association with NGC 1869 and NGC 1873.

References

External links
 

Open clusters
Emission nebulae
ESO objects
1871
Astronomical objects discovered in 1826
Dorado (constellation)
Large Magellanic Cloud